Rochford is a town in Essex, England.

Rochford may also refer to:

Places
Rochford (UK Parliament constituency), a former parliamentary constituency in Essex, England
Rochford, Victoria, Australia
Rochford, Worcestershire, England
Rochford, South Dakota
Rochford District, a district of Essex, England
Stoke Rochford, England

People
Rochford (surname)
Rochford Hughes (1914–1996), British RAF officer

Title
Earl of Rochford
Viscount Rochford